The Islip Handicap was an American Thoroughbred horse race held annually from 1899 through 1907 at New York's Brighton Beach Race Course and then for a final time in 1910 with a drastically reduced purse at Empire City Race Track in Yonkers, New York. A race for horses age three and older, it was contested on dirt over a distance of one mile for the first two runnings then at a mile and one-eighth for the remainder.

Historical notes
The filly Imp won the 1899 inaugural running of the Islip Handicap. She would go on to earn recognition as that year's American Horse of the Year and induction into the U. S. Racing Hall of Fame in 1965.

In winning the 1902 edition, Bonnibert broke the Brighton Beach track record for the mile and one-eighth with a time of 1:51 flat.

End of a race and of a racetrack
The Brighton Beach Race Course prospered until 1908 when the New York Legislature passed the Hart–Agnew Law banning gambling in New York State. Motor racing events were held at the facility in an attempt to keep the track from closing permanently but even after horse racing returned to New York it was too late to save the business.

At the time it ceased horse racing operations, the Brighton Beach Race Course was the oldest horse track in steady use in the New York City area.

Records
Speed record:
 1:51.00 @  miles: Bonnibert (1902) (track tecord)

Most wins:
 No horse won this race more than once

Most wins by a jockey:
 No jockey won this race more than once

Most wins by a trainer:
 2 – Thomas Welsh (1901, 1902)

Most wins by an owner:
 2 – Charles Fleischman's Sons

Winners

References

1899 establishments in New York City
Discontinued horse races in New York (state)
Open mile category horse races
Recurring sporting events established in 1899
Recurring sporting events disestablished in 1911
Brighton Beach Race Course
Empire City Race Track
1909 disestablishments in New York (state)
Discontinued horse races in New York City